Kushk-e Kalejak (also Romanized as Kūshk-e Kalejak) is a village in Nargesan Rural District, Jebalbarez-e Jonubi District, Anbarabad County, Kerman Province, Iran. At the 2006 census, its population was 309, in 71 families.

References 

Populated places in Anbarabad County